The Farman HF.6 was a reconnaissance aircraft built in France shortly before the First World War.

The HF.6 would later be developed into the more advanced Farman HF.14, which differed from the former in having a more streamlined horizontal stabilizer and an oval rudder.

Specifications

References

Bibliography

1910s French military reconnaissance aircraft
HF.06
Single-engined pusher aircraft
1910s French military trainer aircraft
Sesquiplanes
Aircraft first flown in 1911
Rotary-engined aircraft